Ludlam is an English surname. Notable people with the surname include:

Alfred Ludlam (1810–1877), British-New Zealand politician
Charles Ludlam (1943–1987), American actor
Jenny Ludlam (born 1951), New Zealand actress
Scott Ludlam (born 1970), Australian politician 
Steve Ludlam (footballer) (born 1955), English footballer
Thomas Ludlam (1727–1811), English clergyman 
Thomas Ludlam (1775–1810), British colonial administrator
William Ludlam (1717–1788), English clergyman

See also
Ned Ludd, possibly born Ned Ludlam, source of the name of English nineteenth century social movement, the Luddites

English-language surnames